Hong Yoo-jin (홍유진, born February 21, 1989) is a South Korean field hockey player. She competed for the South Korea women's national field hockey team at the 2016 Summer Olympics.

References

1989 births
Living people
South Korean female field hockey players
Olympic field hockey players of South Korea
Field hockey players at the 2016 Summer Olympics